Milliken Mills High School is a high school in the city of Markham, Ontario, Canada. It is one of 33 high schools in the York Region District School Board.

The high school's construction was not scheduled to finish until January 1989 because of a construction worker strike. The students were sent to Unionville High School on September 1988 for the first semester of the school year. Unionville High students went to school from 8:00 am to 12:00 pm and the Milliken Mills students went to school from 1:00 pm to 4:30 pm. Milliken Mills was fully operational in Spring, 1989.

Its service boundary area stretches north from Steeles Avenue, west to Warden Avenue, south from the 14th Avenue, and east to McCowan Road. Milliken Mills High School is a multicultural school at the level of both students and staff, a microcosm of the surrounding community of Markham.

The school is equipped with over 300 computer workstations as of June 2013.

Milliken Mills High School is 1 of 5 schools in the York Region District School Board that offer the IB Diploma Programme along side Maple High School, Dr. G.W. Williams Secondary School, Bayview Secondary School, and Alexander Mackenzie High School.

Enrollment

Feeder schools
Aldergrove Public School
Highgate Public School
Milliken Mills Public School
Randall Public School
Wilclay Public School

Notable alumni

Andre De Grasse, sprinter
George Kottaras, professional baseball player
Corey Muirhead, basketball player with the BK Pardubice of the Czech National Basketball League

See also
List of high schools in Ontario
Milliken, Ontario
Norman Milliken

References

External links

 

York Region District School Board
High schools in the Regional Municipality of York
Buildings and structures in Markham, Ontario
Educational institutions established in 1988
1988 establishments in Ontario